The National Temple is the worship Centre at the convention ground of The Apostolic Church Nigeria located in Olorunda-Ketu, Lagos State.  It has 100,000 capacity seats.

History 
In 1969, the annual Lagos, Western and Northern Areas (LAWNA) Convention which was usually held in Ebute Metta was moved to Orishigun, a town in Ketu due to rapid rate of increasing converts. In 1970, the Convention was moved to the present location in Olorunda-Ketu and 1976 annual Conventions started holding place in what is now known as the Old Convention Hall.

In 1979, the first LAWNA Territorial Chairman, late Pastor S. G. Adegboyega laid the foundation of what was to be the National Temple. In 1994, late Pastor Samuel Jemigbon made rapid progress in the construction of the structure in his tenure as third LAWNA Territorial Chairman.

The National Temple was completed on 19 November 2011 under the pastorship of Pastor Gabriel Olutola who described it as "the House built with prayers" and "a symbol of the church's unification." It has a capacity of 100,000 seats.

See also
List of the largest evangelical church auditoriums

References

Buildings and structures in Lagos
Churches completed in 2011
Churches in Lagos
Evangelical megachurches in Nigeria
21st-century religious buildings and structures in Nigeria